Jaruga may refer to:

 Jaruga, Bosnia and Herzegovina, village near Bosansko Grahovo
 Jaruga Hydroelectric Power Plant, power station near Skradin, Croatia
 Jaruga (river), a subterranean river in the Livanjsko field, Bosnia and Herzegovina
 Jaruga or Yaruha, a village near Busha, Vinnytsia, Ukraine

See also